Noor Muhammad may also refer to:
Noor Muhammad, (1936 - 2010), Pakistani Islamic scholar, writer and politician
Noor Muhammad Butt, (1936),  Pakistani nuclear physicist
Noor Muhammad Jadmani, (1955), former Pakistan's Ambassador to Japan
Noor Muhammad Khan, Bangladeshi politician
Noor Muhammad Lakhir, (1845 - 1937),  Sindhi nationalist, educationist and freedom fighter
Noor Muhammad Lashari, Radio and tv artist of Sindh
Noor Muhammad Dummar, Pakistani politician
Noor Mohammad Kalhoro, (1698-1755), ruled over Sindh as Subahdar of Mughal Emperor
Noor Mohammad Saqib, Afghan Taliban politician
Noor Mohammad Islamjar, Afghan Taliban politician
Noor Mohammad Rohani, Afghan Taliban politician